Vehbi Koç Foundation (VKV) American Hospital, known locally as Amerikan Hastanesi, is a non-profit private hospital located in the Nişantaşı area of Istanbul, Turkey. The hospital was founded in 1920 by Arthur L. Bristol, Rear Admiral in the US Navy, and was initially subsidized by the American Red Cross.

Prior to its transfer to the Vehbi Koç Foundation in 1994, the hospital's funding included financing from USAID and donations from the likes of Lila Acheson Wallace, co-founder of Reader's Digest magazine.

Today, the hospital serves over 220,000 patients annually at its 60,500 m2 (651,216 sq. ft) site with 278 inpatient beds, 36 intensive care beds, and 12 operating rooms. Facilities include an emergency department and helipad.

References 

Hospitals in Istanbul
Koç family
Şişli